Cosmopterix gracilis is a moth of the family Cosmopterigidae. It is known from China (Jiangxi), Japan, Korea and Russia.

The length of the forewings is about 5.7 mm.

References

gracilis
Moths of Japan